Baron Abinger, of Abinger in the County of Surrey and of the City of Norwich, is a title in the Peerage of the United Kingdom. It was created on 12 January 1835 for the prominent lawyer and politician Sir James Scarlett, the Lord Chief Baron of the Exchequer. Lord Abinger was succeeded by his eldest son, the second Baron. He represented Norwich and Horsham in the House of Commons. He was succeeded by his son, the third Baron. He was a lieutenant-general in the army and fought in the Crimean War. On the death of his son, the fourth Baron, the line of the eldest son of the first Baron failed. The late Baron was succeeded by his second cousin, the fifth Baron. He was the grandson of Peter Campbell Scarlett, third son of the first Baron. When he died the title passed to his younger brother, the sixth Baron, and then to another brother, the seventh Baron.  the title is held by the latter's grandson, the ninth Baron, who succeeded his father in 2002.

Sir James Yorke Scarlett, second son of the first Baron, was a general in the army and fought in the Crimean War. Mary Elizabeth, daughter of the first Baron, was created Baroness Stratheden in 1836. She was the wife of John Campbell, 1st Baron Campbell.

Baron Abinger (1835)
James Scarlett, 1st Baron Abinger (1769–1844)
Robert Campbell Scarlett, 2nd Baron Abinger (1794–1861)
William Frederick Scarlett, 3rd Baron Abinger (1826–1892)
James Yorke Macgregor Scarlett, 4th Baron Abinger (1871–1903)
Shelley Leopold Laurence Scarlett, 5th Baron Abinger (1872–1917)
Robert Brooke Campbell Scarlett, 6th Baron Abinger (1876–1927)
Hugh Richard Scarlett, 7th Baron Abinger (1878–1943)
James Richard Scarlett, 8th Baron Abinger (1914–2002)
James Harry Scarlett, 9th Baron Abinger (born 1959)

The heir presumptive is the present holder's nephew, Harry Alexander Peter Scarlett (born 1997).

Male-line family tree

See also
Baron Stratheden and Campbell

Notes

References

Baronies in the Peerage of the United Kingdom
Noble titles created in 1835
Noble titles created for UK MPs